The Marshal of the Army of God and the Holy Church was the title displayed from 1215 by Robert Fitzwalter, the leader of the baronial opposition against John, King of England and one of the twenty-five sureties of Magna Carta. He was feudal baron of Little Dunmow, Essex and constable of Baynard's Castle, in London, to which was annexed the hereditary office of castellain and chief banneret of the City of London. He was elected by his fellow barons, and held the title at least from when the rebels armed themselves in Lincolnshire and formally defied King John. He retained the title at least until he received back the custody of Hertford castle in June. He died on 9 December 1235, and is buried in the Priory Church in Little Dunmow.

Robert I
Marshal of the Army of God and the Holy Church Robert Fitzwalter Baron of Little Dunmow, Constable of Baynard's Castle, Castellain and Chief Banneret of the City of London, member of the Security Council of the Barons as enshrined in Magna Carta.

Marshal of the Army of God and the Holy Church (1215–1235)

See also
Robert Fitzwalter
John, King of England

Notes
Footnotes

References

Barons' Wars